Governor Berry may refer to:

James Henderson Berry (1841–1913), 14th Governor of Arkansas
Nathaniel S. Berry (1796–1894), 28th Governor of New Hampshire
Tom Berry (South Dakota politician) (1879–1951), 14th Governor of South Dakota